Alexandru Kozovits (Hungarian: Kozovits Sándor) (born 3 September 1899, date of death unknown) was a Romanian footballer of Hungarian ethnicity. He competed in the men's tournament at the 1924 Summer Olympics.

References

External links

1899 births
Year of death missing
Romanian footballers
Romania international footballers
Olympic footballers of Romania
Footballers at the 1924 Summer Olympics
Sportspeople from Timișoara
Association football defenders
CA Timișoara players